Peter Nahum is an English art dealer, author, lecturer and journalist who is known for his many appearances on the long running BBC television program Antiques Roadshow, on which he appeared from 1981 to 2002. He discovered a long lost Richard Dadd watercolour on the show which was subsequently sold to the British Museum.

Biography
Nahum was educated at Sherborne School and began his career at Peter Wilson's Sotheby's in 1966. During his 17 years with the company, he initiated the Victorian Painting Department at the newly opened Sotheby's Belgravia in 1971, and was head of the British Painting Department (1840 to Contemporary) until his departure in 1984. He was also a Senior Director sitting on the chairman's committee and advisor to the British Rail Pension Fund on Victorian Paintings.

He left Sotheby's in 1984 to open his own gallery, The Leicester Galleries, in St James's, London, specialising in paintings, drawings and sculptures of the highest quality from the 19th and 20th centuries. He now works independently, actively buying and selling and is currently adviser to major private collections and museums throughout the world, signatory on authentication certificates for Victorian paintings sold to Japan and official valuer for the Department of Arts, Heritage and Environment of the Government of Australia. He also acts as a celebrity auctioneer for many charities. He is a television personality, academic, lecturer, author, frame designer and frequent lender of paintings to international exhibitions.

Nahum created the trading website onlinegalleries.com for the art and antique dealers around the world, all members of C.I.N.O.A. and their own national trade associations. This gives the dealers a trading platform and a chance to display their wares in their own purpose-built websites and galleries, and gives the public the opportunity to buy with confidence.

Public appearances
From 1981 to 2002, Peter Nahum was a regular contributor to the BBC's Antiques Roadshow, rediscovering Richard Dadd's lost watercolour Artists Halt in the Desert in 1987, which was later sold to the British Museum, and an album of Filipino landscapes sold in 1995 for £240,000. Other BBC Television appearances include Omnibus (1983), with Richard Baker on Richard Dadd's Oberon and Titania, and In at the Deep End (1984), a three-quarter of an hour program during which he taught television journalist Chris Searle to auctioneer. He has also appeared on Breakfast Television, The City Program and Signals and on Sixty Minutes, as well as various radio talk shows.. Throughout his career he has reported art fakers to the police, and has had success both in seeing them convicted and seeing the law crystallized in respect to the definition of fakes and faking. In this respect he has appeared in The Artful Codgers made for BBC Four in November 2007. In 1984, Nahum who first reported the Greenhalgh family to the police with full evidence, although it took another 16 years to convict them.

In 1986, Nahum lectured on "Victorian Painters as Super Stars – Their Public and Private Art", at the Smithsonian Institution, Washington DC, USA, and in 1993 on "The Poetry of Crisis: British Art 1933–1951" at the Victoria & Albert Museum. More recently he spoke on "The Strange Forces around the Finding of Richard Dadd’s Artist’s Halt in the Desert", for the National Arts Collection Fund. He lectures to student bodies and various other organisations.

Bibliography
Peter Nahum writes for daily press, for antiques magazines and museum & gallery catalogues.

His published works include:

Sir Lawrence Alma-Tadema, OM RA – A Catalogue of Thirty Five Paintings and Watercolours, Designed and edited by Peter Nahum, Sotheby & Co, 1973
Prices of Victorian Paintings, Drawings and Watercolours, by Peter Nahum, Carter Nash Cameron, 1976 
Monograms of Victorian and Edwardian Artists, by Peter Nahum, Victoria Square Press, 1976 
Victorian Painters' Monograms, by Peter Nahum, W. Foulsham & Co., 1977
Jessie M. King and E. A. Taylor – Illustrator and Designer, designed and edited by Peter Nahum, Paul Harris Publishing and Sotheby's Belgravia, 1977
Cross Section, British Art in The Twentieth Century, Peter Nahum Limited, 1989
British Art from the Twentieth Century, Peter Nahum Limited, 1989
Burne-Jones, The Pre-Raphaelites and their Century, 2 volumes, by Hilary Morgan and Peter Nahum, Peter Nahum Limited, 1989
Michael Rothenstein's Boxes, by Mel Gooding, conceived, designed and edited by Peter Nahum, Art Books International Ltd, 1992
Burne-Jones A Quest for Love, by Bill Waters, co-authored, edited and published by Peter Nahum, Peter Nahum Ltd, 1993
Henri Gaudier-Brzeska – A Sculptor Drawings, conceived, designed and edited by Peter Nahum, The Leicester Galleries, 1995
John Tunnard, His Life and his Work, Alan Peat and Brian Whitton (foreword by Peter Nahum), Scolar Press, London, 1997
Fairy Folk in Fairy Land, by Peter Nahum, The Leicester Galleries, 1998
Pre-Raphaelite . Symbolist . Visionary, by Peter Nahum and Sally Burgess, The Leicester Galleries, 2001
Medieval to Modern, by Peter Nahum and Sally Burgess, The Leicester Galleries, 2003
The Brotherhood of Ruralists and The Pre-Raphaelites, by Peter Nahum and Sally Burgess, The Leicester Galleries, 2005
Master Drawings, The Leicester Galleries, 2006
Paul Raymond Gregory; My Secret Book, designed and written by Peter Nahum, The Leicester Galleries, 2007
Ancient Landscapes – Pastoral Visions: Samuel Palmer to the Ruralists, by Anne Anderson, Robert Meyrick and Peter Nahum, Southampton City Art Gallery, April–June 2008; then touring Victoria Gallery Bath, Falmouth Art Gallery and Cube Gallery Plymouth until 19 December 2008

Contributions
Nomi Rowe, In Celebration of Cecil Collins, Visionary Artist and Educator, London 2008, pages 49 – 51
Past and Present: Edward Burne-Jones, His Medieval Sources and Their Relevance to his Personal Journey, by William Waters and Peter Nahum, in Edward Burne-Jones: The Earthly Paradise, Staatsgalerie Stuttgart and Kunstmuseum Bern, pages 179–203, Hartje Cantz, Ostfildern 2009

DVD documentary

Paul Raymond Gregory's RingQuest, Narrated by Julian Sands; Narration written by Peter Nahum; Executive producer: Peter Nahum; Produced, directed and edited by Mathias Walin; Photography and sound by Martin Sundström.

Notes

References

External links
Nahum at the Leicester Galleries

Antiques experts
English art dealers
People educated at Sherborne School
Living people
Year of birth missing (living people)